James Arthur Watson (born June 28, 1943) is a Canadian former professional ice hockey defenceman.

Career 
Watson played in the National Hockey League with the Detroit Red Wings and Buffalo Sabres between 1964 and 1972, and later in the World Hockey Association with the Los Angeles Sharks, Chicago Cougars, and Quebec Nordiques between 1972 and 1976.

In his NHL career, Watson played in 221 games, scoring four goals and adding nineteen assists. In the WHA, Watson played in 231 games, scoring seven goals and adding thirty-three assists. He also scored the first goal in Buffalo Sabres history against Les Binkley in a 2–1 win over the Pittsburgh Penguins.

Career statistics

Regular season and playoffs

External links
 

1943 births
Living people
Baltimore Clippers players
Buffalo Sabres players
Canadian ice hockey defencemen
Chicago Cougars players
Cincinnati Wings players
Cleveland Barons (1937–1973) players
Detroit Red Wings players
Fort Worth Wings players
Greensboro Generals (SHL) players
Hamilton Red Wings (OHA) players
Ice hockey people from Quebec
Long Island Cougars players
Los Angeles Sharks players
Memphis Wings players
People from Abitibi-Témiscamingue
Pittsburgh Hornets players
Quebec Nordiques (WHA) players
San Diego Gulls (WHL) players